Jon Burklo (born March 8, 1984) is an American soccer coach.

Burklo is married and has a son. He is the Director of a new soccer club Liberty Soccer Club (2013). He played his club soccer with Black Watch. He went on to play soccer at Liberty University from 2002 to 2005. In 2005, he spent the collegiate off season with the Richmond Kickers Future of the fourth division Premier Development League. In 2006, he was on the roster with the Cincinnati Kings of the PDL, but does not appear to have played any league games. Burklo moved to Europe where he signed with Atlantis FC in the Finnish Ykkönen (Second Division) in January 2007. He had played seven games when the team announced it had no money to continue paying its players. Burklo was then released from the team and in April 2007, he signed a one-year contract with RoPS in the Ykkönen. On August 28, 2007, he moved to JIPPO back in the Ykkönen. In 2008, Burklo signed with the Wilmington Hammerheads of the USL Second Division. During the season, he also spent time with the D.C. United reserve team.

References

External links
 Wilmington Hammerheads Player Profile

1984 births
American expatriate soccer players
Expatriate footballers in Finland
Atlantis FC players
Rovaniemen Palloseura players
Cincinnati Kings players
Soccer players from Tampa, Florida
Living people
Richmond Kickers Future players
USL Second Division players
Wilmington Hammerheads FC players
USL League Two players
Soccer players from Colorado
JIPPO players
American soccer players
Association football defenders